The 1992–93 season was Blackpool F.C.'s 85th season (82nd consecutive) in the Football League. They competed in the 24-team Division Two, then the third tier of English league football (after the formation of the new Premier League), finishing eighteenth. It was Billy Ayre's second full season as manager.

David Eyres was the club's top league goalscorer, with sixteen goals.

Hartlepool United set a new English football record of thirteen consecutive games without scoring a goal. The streak ended when they visited Bloomfield Road for a league match on 6 March.

Table

References

Bibliography

 

1992-93
1992–93 Football League Second Division by team